Boyerstown is a townland in County Meath, Ireland. The M3 motorway runs through the townland.

The parish of Boyerstown, along with another parish called Cortown, historically has been linked to the neighbouring parish of Bohermeen, with the parish priest and curate serving all three parishes.

See also
 Ardbraccan
 Ardbraccan House
 Durhamstown Castle
 List of towns and villages in Ireland

References

External links
Archaeological discoveries while building the N3 in Boyerstown
More archaeological discoveries while planning the road
Architecture link showing a historic thatched house in Boyerstown

Townlands of County Meath